Rosa María de la Garza Ramírez (also known as 'Rosi Orozco'), born July 6, 1960, is a Mexican Activist who's cause is the fight against Human Trafficking in Mexico. She was first introduced to the plight of Human Trafficking around the world when she attended a training conducted by the organization Concerned Women for America and the United States Justice Department in 2005. She returned home with the commitment of opening a shelter for girls victims of this crime. She quickly realized that there was very little knowledge about trafficking in persons in Mexico; Orozco set out to remedy that, and in 2007 opened the first shelter for girls in Mexico City. After four years of learning and speaking to anyone she could about the topic, she realized that without a strong law, this crime could not begin to be eradicated. She was invited by the PAN Party to run for congress, although she never officially registered or affiliated to the party, she did win the seat. From 2009 to 2012 she served as Deputy (Congresswoman) of the LXI Legislature of the Mexican Congress representing the Federal District. She held a number of committee positions, including president of the Special Commission for the Fight against Trafficking in Persons. She campaigned for a change to human trafficking laws and was a key player in the passage of the General Law to Prevent, Punish and Eradicate Crimes of Human Trafficking and to Protect and Assist the Victims of This Crime, in 2012.

After her time in congress, she became a full-time activist dedicated to the protection of victims of trafficking and to continue pushing for stronger legislation. Rosi is the President of United vs Trafficking. In 2013 Rosi Orozco helped establish and launch a Trafficking in Persons hotline for the purpose of receiving and giving attention to reports on trafficking by citizens.

Out of her own volition, Orozco asked to be investigated by the Central Investigation for Special Causes Agency of the State of Mexico City's District Attorney Office; after accusations came from a sitting senator that she was profiting by government funds and of having a network of companies on behalf of her relatives to obtain contracts and agreements for public resources, all of these accusations came within the context of a strong opposition to reforms being pushed through in the Senate that would gravely affect the current Law and would set traffickers free. Rosi Orozco was found to be clean of all the accusations, and thus has taken legal action against the Senator.

During the Global Sustainability Network Summit in February 2019, the Secretary of Human Rights of the State of Mexico communicated that the agency that he heads would postulate Orozco as a candidate to the Nobel Prize for her trajectory as a Human Rights activist. The letter of intent has been sent to the Nobel Foundation.

AWARDS:

For her work against trafficking, Rosi Orozco has been awarded several important recognitions both internationally and nationally:

2011

Omecíhuatl Medal - National Institute of Women

50 Mujeres que mueven Mexico - Quien Magazine

2012

150 Most Courageous Women -  Newsweek New York

Premio a la Actitud Positiva en el Bien Público - Cumbre de Comunicación.

Golden Microphone - Broadcasters Association of Mexico

2013, 2014, 2016, 2017, 2018

50 Most powerful women in Mexico - Forbes Magazine Mexico

2013

Unlikely Heroes Award - Unlikely Heroes Organization

2014

Paloma de Plata - Convivencia sin Violencia

Recognition for the advancement of the fight against trafficking - Proconciencia, France

2015

Recognition Profersora Enriqueta López de Cabrera - Universidad Realística de México

20 Leaders of 2015 -  Mujer Ejecutiva Magazine

2016

Golden Microphone - Broadcasters Association of Mexico

2018

Those Who Inspire Award

2019

PUBLISHED WORKS:

2011

Del Cielo al Infierno - Publicaciones Diamante

2012

Cuidado con Malgato

2016

Explotacion Sexual - Esclavitud como negocio familiar - LD Book

References

1960 births
Living people
Politicians from Mexico City
Women members of the Chamber of Deputies (Mexico)
Members of the Chamber of Deputies (Mexico) for Mexico City
National Action Party (Mexico) politicians
21st-century Mexican politicians
21st-century Mexican women politicians
Deputies of the LXI Legislature of Mexico